Serdiana is a comune (municipality) in the Province of South Sardinia in the Italian region Sardinia, located about  north of Cagliari.

Serdiana borders the following municipalities: Dolianova, Donorì, Monastir, Sant'Andrea Frius, Sestu, Settimo San Pietro, Soleminis, Ussana.

Demographic evolution

References

Cities and towns in Sardinia